The Men's pole vault event at the 2013 European Athletics U23 Championships was held in Tampere, Finland, at Ratina Stadium on 12 and 14 July.

Medalists

Results

Final
14 July 2013

Qualifications
Qualified: qualifying perf. 5.40 (Q) or 12 best performers (q) advance to the Final

Summary

Details

Group A
12 July 2013 / 19:15

Group B
12 July 2013 / 19:15

Participation
According to an unofficial count, 27 athletes from 16 countries participated in the event.

References

Pole vault
Pole vault at the European Athletics U23 Championships